Something's Up is an album by guitarist Doug Raney recorded in 1988 and released on the Danish label, SteepleChase.

Track listing 
All compositions by Doug Raney except where noted.
 "Fata" (Thomas Franck) – 11:25
 "Fee-Fi-Fo-Fum" (Wayne Shorter) – 8:00
 "Good Morning" (Bernt Rosengren) – 6:35
 "Star Eyes" (Gene de Paul, Don Raye) – 8:23 Bonus track on CD reissue
 "Speedy Recovery" – 8:11 Bonus track on CD reissue 
 "God Bless the Child" (Billie Holiday, Arthur Herzog Jr.) – 11:32
 "The Parting of the Ways" (Franck) – 11:20

Personnel 
Doug Raney – guitar
Bernt Rosengren – tenor saxophone
Tomas Franck – tenor saxophone, soprano saxophone
Jesper Lundgaard – bass
Jukkis Uotila – drums

References 

Doug Raney albums
1989 albums
SteepleChase Records albums